Fawzi Burhma (born 2 October 1950) is a Kuwaiti former swimmer. He competed in the men's 200 metre freestyle at the 1972 Summer Olympics.

References

External links
 

1950 births
Living people
Kuwaiti male swimmers
Olympic swimmers of Kuwait
Swimmers at the 1972 Summer Olympics
Place of birth missing (living people)